Ramazan Kahya (born 16 September 1984) is a Turkish former professional footballer. He played as a left back. Kahya has also been capped by the Turkey Olympic team.

References

External links

1984 births
People from Bornova
Footballers from İzmir
Living people
Turkish footballers
Turkey under-21 international footballers
Association football midfielders
Altay S.K. footballers
Malatyaspor footballers
Sakaryaspor footballers
Ankaraspor footballers
Konyaspor footballers
Göztepe S.K. footballers
Yeni Malatyaspor footballers
Gaziantep F.K. footballers
Kahramanmaraşspor footballers
Ankara Demirspor footballers
Süper Lig players
TFF First League players
TFF Second League players
Mediterranean Games silver medalists for Turkey
Mediterranean Games medalists in football
Competitors at the 2005 Mediterranean Games